Omid A. Payrow Shabani is an Iranian philosopher and Professor of Philosophy at the University of Guelph.
Payrow Shabani is known for his expertise on constitutional patriotism, Iranian politics and Jürgen Habermas's philosophy. 
He was awarded an Andrew Mellon Postdoctoral Fellowship in 2002.

Books
 Democracy, Power, and Legitimacy: Critical Theory of Jürgen Habermas, Toronto: University of Toronto Press, 2003
 Multiculturalism and the Law: A Critical Debate, University of Wales Press, March 2007.
 Introduction to Social and Political Philosophy, eds. Omid Payrow Shabani and Monique Deveaux, Oxford University Press, 2014

See also
Douglas Moggach
Kantian ethics

References

External links
 Omid Payrow Shabani at University of Guelph
 Omid Payrow Shabani, Google Scholar Citations

21st-century Iranian philosophers
Continental philosophers
Political philosophers
Habermas scholars
Philosophy academics
Academic staff of the University of Guelph
Living people
Carleton University alumni
Year of birth missing (living people)
Canadian philosophers